Miresa gilba is a moth species in the family of Limacodidae found in Ghana. The type provided from Kete Kratje.

This species has a wingspan of 28mm.

References

Endemic fauna of Ghana
Limacodidae
Insects of West Africa
Moths of Africa
Moths described in 1899